CB Socuéllamos is a Spanish professional basketball team.

In May 2021, CB Socuéllamos was proclaimed champion of the Primera División de Baloncesto of Castile-La Mancha and promoted to the Liga EBA. 

CB Socuéllamos beat CB La Solana in a crowded home arena in what the Spanish news site infoSocuellamos called "perhaps the best game of the season". 

The grand final started with an 8-0 run for Socuéllamos. La Solana got into the game little by little but were still down 36-29 at halftime. The game ended 67-54. 

The MVP of the final was the CB Socuéllamos player Diego Fox with +26 efficiency, 22 points and 7 rebounds. 

The game was the final duel for the championship between the two teams whose season series had been split 1-1. Socuéllamos had beaten CB UCA 71-67 in the semifinals.

2021 Players
 Diego Fox 
 Chike Augustine

Head coach position
2021  Manuel Jiménez "Junior"

Home gym
As of 2021, the team plays its home games at the Pabellón Roberto Parra.

Sponsorship
In May 2021, the team's main sponsor was Cabezuelo.

References

External links
Spanish Basketball Federation profile 
Eurobasket.com profile

Basketball teams in Spain
Basketball teams in Castilla–La Mancha